Black sand is sand that is black in color. One type of black sand is a heavy, glossy, partly magnetic mixture of usually fine sands containing minerals such as magnetite, found as part of a placer deposit. Another type of black sand, found on beaches near a volcano, consists of tiny fragments of basalt.

While some beaches are predominantly made of black sand, even other color beaches (e.g. gold and white) can often have deposits of black sand, particularly after storms. Larger waves can sort out sand grains leaving deposits of heavy minerals visible on the surface of erosion escarpments.

Placer deposits

Black sands are used by miners and prospectors to indicate the presence of a placer formation. Placer mining activities produce a concentrate that is composed mostly of black sand.  Black sand concentrates often contain additional valuables, other than precious metals: rare earth elements, thorium, titanium, tungsten, zirconium and others are often fractionated during igneous processes into a common mineral-suite that becomes black sands after weathering and erosion.

Several gemstones, such as garnet, topaz, ruby, sapphire, and diamond are found in placers and in the course of placer mining, and sands of these gems are found in black sands and concentrates.  Purple or ruby-colored garnet sand often forms a showy surface dressing on ocean beach placers.

An example of a non-volcanic black sand beach is at Langkawi in Malaysia.

Basalt fragments

When lava contacts water, it cools rapidly and shatters into sand and fragmented debris of various size.  Much of the debris is small enough to be considered sand.  A large lava flow entering an ocean may produce enough basalt fragments to build a new black sand beach almost overnight.  The famous "black sand" beaches of Hawaii, such as Punaluʻu Beach and Kehena Beach, were created virtually instantaneously by the violent interaction between hot lava and sea water. Since a black sand beach is made by a lava flow in a one time event, they tend to be rather short lived since sands do not get replenished if currents or storms wash sand into deeper water. For this reason, the state of Hawaii has made it illegal to remove black sand from its beaches. Further, a black sand beach is vulnerable to being inundated by future lava flows, as was the case for Hawaiʻi's Kaimū, usually known simply as Black Sand Beach, and Kalapana beaches. An even shorter-lived black sand beach was Kamoamoa. Unlike with white and green sand beaches, walking barefoot on black sand can result in burns, as the black sand absorbs more solar radiation.

Beaches

Black sand has formed beaches in places including:

Europe
 Bulgaria
 Burgas
 Faroe Islands
 Fuglafjørđur
 Tjørnuvík
 Italy
 Ladispoli
 Naples
 Georgia
 Ureki
 Greece
 Perivolos beach, Santorini
 Cyprus
 Governor's Beach, Limassol
 Iceland
Vík í Mýrdal
 Reykjanes
Stokksnes
 Portugal
 Azores
 São Roque, São Miguel
 Mosteiros, São Miguel
 Madeira
 Spain
 Tenerife
 Playa El Bollullo, near Puerto de la Cruz
 Playa Jardín, Puerto de la Cruz
 Playa Las Gaviotas near Santa Cruz
 La Palma
 Playa de Los Cancajos, Breña Baja
 Fuerteventura
 Playa de Ajuy
 Playa Pozo Negro
Galicia
Praia de Teixidelo, Cedeira (non-volcanic)

Africa 
Egypt
Algeria
Cameroon
 Limbe
 Idenau
 Debundscha

North America 
 Canada
 Black Beach, Lorneville, New Brunswick (near Coleson Cove Generating station, west of Saint John)
 Salmon Cove Beach, Conception Bay, Newfoundland
 Mexico
 Playa Patzcuarito (Nayarit)
 Playa La Ventanilla (Oaxaca)
 United States
 Black Sand Beach, Prince William Sound, Alaska,
 Lowell Point Beach, Seward, Alaska
 Black Sand Beach, Lost Coast, California

Central America
 Costa Rica
 Playa Negra, Guanacaste
 Playa Negra, Puerto Viejo, Limón
 Guatemala
 Puerto de San José, Monterrico, Champerico, Puerto Quetzal
 Panama
 Las Lajas, Chiriquí Province
 El Salvador
 Playa El Tunco

Caribbean
 Saint Vincent and the Grenadines
 Montserrat (most beaches except Rendezvous Beach)
 St. Eustatius
 St. Kitts
 Nevis
 Jamaica
 Dominica (most beaches)
 Martinique (most North east Beaches and Anse Noire beach)
 St. Lucia
 Anse Chastanet
 Guadeloupe
 Grand Anse beach, Basse-Terre
 Grenada
 Venezuela
 St.Thomas (USVI)
 Puerto Rico (US)
 Barceloneta, Machuca's Garden
 Playa Negra in Vieques
 Dominican Republic
 Cocolandia, Palenque Beach, San Cristóbal
 Baní Sand Dunes, Peravia, Baní
Black Stone Beach, Santa Cruz, Aruba

Asia
 Varkala Black Beach, Varkala, Kerala, India
 Alappad, Kollam, Kerala, India
 Valsad, India
 Hac Sa Beach, Macao
 Hunza River, Pakistan
 Jambi, Indonesia
 Langkawi, Malaysia
 Lung Kwu Tan, Hong Kong
 Kaohsiung, Taiwan
 Yilan, Taiwan
 Akyab, Arakan
 Kaladan River, Chin State and Rakhine State, Myanmar
 Lingayen Gulf, Philippines

North Atlantic
 Reynisfjara, Iceland

North Pacific
 Iwo Jima
 Kugenuma Kaigan, Japan
 Hawaiʻi nei
 "Big Island"
 Isaac Hale Beach Park (Pohoʻiki)
 Kaimū (destroyed by lava flow in 1990, now a new black sand beach is forming)
 Kehena Beach
 Punaluʻu Beach
 Richardson Beach, Hilo
 Waipiʻo Beach
 Maui
 Honokalani Black Sand Beach and Waiʻanapanapa Black Sand Beach in Waiʻanapanapa State Park
 Oneʻuli Beach also known as Naupaka Beach

South Pacific
 Guam
 Talafofo
 New Zealand (listed from North to South)
 Muriwai
 Bethells Beach
 Anawhata
 Piha
 Karekare
 Whatipu
 Karioitahi Beach
 Raglan
 Taranaki region, New Zealand
 Wellington region, New Zealand
 Tahiti
 Tautira
 Point Venus
 Papua New Guinea
 Gulf of Papua

Indian Ocean
 South coast of Java, Indonesia (ironsand)

See also
 Diamond
 Heavy mineral sands ore deposits
 Ironsand
 Mining
 Placer deposit

References

Sand
Economic geology
Sediments